The Municipality of Dravograd is a municipality in northern Slovenia, on the border with Austria. The seat of the municipality is the town of Dravograd. The Drava River runs through the middle of the municipality. Most of its territory is part of the traditional Slovenian province of Carinthia, but a large southern and eastern part of its territory is part of the traditional Slovenian province of Styria. It is also part of the larger Carinthia Statistical Region.

Settlements
In addition to the municipal seat of Dravograd, the municipality also includes the following settlements:

 Bukovje
 Bukovska Vas
 Črneče
 Črneška Gora
 Dobrova pri Dravogradu
 Gorče
 Goriški Vrh
 Kozji Vrh nad Dravogradom
 Libeliče
 Libeliška Gora
 Ojstrica
 Otiški Vrh
 Podklanc
 Selovec
 Šentjanž pri Dravogradu
 Sveti Boštjan
 Sveti Danijel
 Sveti Duh
 Tolsti Vrh pri Ravnah na Koroškem
 Trbonje
 Tribej
 Velka
 Vič
 Vrata

These settlements are grouped into five local communities: Dravograd, Črneče, Libeliče, Šentjanž pri Dravogradu, and Trbonje.

References

External links

Municipality of Dravograd on Geopedia
 Municipality of Dravograd website

 
Dravograd
Carinthia (Slovenia)
1994 establishments in Slovenia